"Pridi, dala ti bom cvet" is a song that served as 's entry at the Eurovision Song Contest 1970. The song marked the third of four occasions in which Yugoslavia's entry was performed in Slovene. It was sung by 18-year-old Slovenian music newcomer Eva Sršen.

Pesma Evrovizije 1970
Sršen won the right to compete for Yugoslavia after winning Pesma Evrovizije 1970, held on February 14, 1970, where she competed against 14 other performers. Sršen performed fifth at the final and at the end of voting, "Pridi, dala ti bom cvet" received 26 points from the nine member jury, placing her first. This allowed the Socialist Republic of Slovenia to represent the whole of Yugoslavia in Amsterdam.

At Eurovision
At Amsterdam, the song was performed fourth on the night, after 's Gianni Morandi with "Occhi di ragazza", and before 's Jean Vallée with "Viens l'oublier". The song uses the metaphor of "flowers", as the singer describes that she is the flower "that nobody can reach but you", the "you" implying her secret love.

RTÉ commentator Valerie McGovern deemed the performance "simple and ungimmicky", ostensibly comparing it to the Italian entry performed right before, of which McGovern simply said, "it was certainly a happy approach any way he gave it".

Cover version
In 2010, an a cappella cover version by singer Barbara Mratinkovič (aka LadyBird Barbara) was produced by Aldo Ivančič and published on YouTube as a retro 1970s-style musical video, directed by Neven Korda.

References

Songs about flowers
Eurovision songs of 1970
Eurovision songs of Yugoslavia
1970 songs
Slovene-language songs